Mixenden is a village in Calderdale, on the outskirts of Halifax in the county of West Yorkshire, England. The name Mixenden derives from the Anglo Saxon 'mixen' (compost or dung heap) and 'den' usually refers to pasture land, usually for pigs.

During the 1970s, after the building of tower blocks in Mixenden, social problems and unemployment led to a tarnished reputation.

At one time like many other villages it boasted of 3 pubs, a nightclub, 3 fish and chip shops, numerous family businesses including a butcher's, a baker's, a newsagent's, a grocer's, a garage with petrol, a doctors' surgery, a library and two factories, two churches and two schools.
Not many of these are left and the one remaining pub, the Crown and Anchor, closed in 2010 and was later converted into cottages.

Currently in Mixenden there is a primary school split across two sites, three newsagents with off licences, one launderette, one fish and chip shop, two pizza/Indian takeaways, one Chinese takeaway, two sandwich shops, a library, a council-funded activity centre and a doctors' surgery (Caritas Group Practice Mixenden).

There are also numerous public children's play areas that are maintained by Calderdale Council.

To the north-west of the village is a large reservoir that is maintained by Yorkshire Water.

As of January 2017, The councillors for the Mixenden Ward are Clr Barry Collins, Clr Lisa Lambert and Clr Daniel Sutherland.

See also
Listed buildings in Illingworth, West Yorkshire and Mixenden

References

External links

Ward data - Calderdale Council
 

Villages in West Yorkshire
Areas of Halifax, West Yorkshire